Bartol or Bártol is a surname. Notable people with the surname include:

Harald Bartol (born 1947), Austrian motorcycle racer
James Lawrence Bartol (1813–1887), American jurist
Pedro Nuno Bártol, Portuguese diplomat
Sören Bartol (born 1974), German politician
Vladimir Bartol (1903–1967), Slovene writer

See also
 Phenobarbital, by the trade name Bartol